Route 631, or Highway 631, may refer to:

Canada
Alberta Highway 631
 Ontario Highway 631
Saskatchewan Highway 631

United Kingdom
 A631 road

United States